P. carbonaria  may refer to:
 Percina carbonaria, the Texas logperch, a small bony fish species
 Pipiza carbonaria, a hoverfly species in the genus Pipiza
 Psilocybe carbonaria, a mushroom species

See also
 Carbonaria (disambiguation)